"Inner Smile" is a song by Scottish alternative rock band Texas, originally released on their greatest hits album, The Greatest Hits (2000). Written by Gregg Alexander and Rick Nowels and arranged by Texas, the song is based on Alexander's unreleased demo "Inner Child", which was written and performed between 1995 and 1998.

"Inner Smile" was scheduled to be released on 25 December 2000, but it was delayed to 8 January 2001, when it was issued as the second single from The Greatest Hits. The song peaked at number six on the UK Singles Chart, reached number eight in Spain, and charted within the top 20 in Ireland, Italy, and the Netherlands.

Music video
The video, directed by Vaughan Arnell, is an homage to Elvis Presley (and specifically his '68 Comeback Special) with lead singer Sharleen Spiteri dressed as Elvis in his famous black leather suit and using prosthetics to resemble Elvis. It begins with Sharleen/Elvis turning on a TV (probably to see "the show", i.e. the video clip), then she/he begins to sing. It had some black and white stills showing her in distinct situations (in one of them, Sharleen/Elvis proudly holds a belt with the word "SHAR" instead of "ELVIS", formed with diamonds). In some scenes, she switches from her Elvis costume to another black leather outfit (without prosthetics). The video clip was shot in London in November 2000 with a live audience and with the band members playing different roles as musicians and/or audience members (with Spiteri portraying various groupies). In one of the scenes, Sharleen (as Elvis) sings along with Sharleen. It is often assumed this scene represents Elvis and Priscilla Presley.

Track listings

UK CD1 (MERCD 531)
 "Inner Smile" – 3:49
 "Inner Smile" (extended 12-inch) – 9:47
 "Across the Universe"  – 4:13
 "Inner Smile" (video)

UK CD2 (MERDD 531)
 "Inner Smile" – 3:49
 "Inner Smile" (Jules' Club Radio Mix) – 4:35
 "Inner Smile" (Stonebridge Classic House Mix) – 6:31
 "Inner Smile" (Rae & Christian Basement Mix) – 4:57

UK cassette single (MERMC 531)
A1. "Inner Smile" – 3:49
A2. "Inner Smile" (Moody Mix) – 4:36
B1. "Inner Smile" (Stonebridge Classic House Mix) – 7:20

European CD single (572 774-2)
 "Inner Smile" – 3:49
 "I Don't Want a Lover" (live) – 5:30

Australian CD single (572 772-2)
 "Inner Smile" – 3:49
 "Inner Smile" (Stonebridge Classic House Mix) – 7:21
 "Tired of Being Alone" – 3:27
 "Across the Universe"  – 4:13
 "Inner Smile" (video)

Personnel
Personnel are lifted from The Greatest Hits album booklet.

 Johnny McElhone – writing, keyboards, production (as Johnny Mac)
 Sharleen Spiteri – writing, backing vocals
 Gregg Alexander – writing, production
 Rick Nowels – writing, backing vocals, keyboards
 Eddie Campbell – backing vocals, keyboards
 Ally McErlaine – guitars
 Wayne Rodrigues – drum programming
 Ash Howes – mixing

Charts and certifications

Weekly charts

Year-end charts

Certifications

References

External links
 
  

2000 songs
2001 singles
Mercury Records singles
Music videos directed by Vaughan Arnell
Song recordings produced by Gregg Alexander
Songs written by Gregg Alexander
Songs written by Johnny McElhone
Songs written by Rick Nowels
Songs written by Sharleen Spiteri
Texas (band) songs